Jackson Van Tonder Chauke (born 29 May 1985) is a South African professional boxer who has held the WBC International flyweight title since 2019. As an amateur he won silver medals at the 2006 Commonwealth Games and 2007 All-Africa Games, both in the flyweight division.

Career
At Melbourne 2006 he lost the final to Don Broadhurst.

At the AllAfricans he was defeated by local Abderahim Mechenouai.

At the world championships 2007 he lost his first match to Mexican Braulio Ávila and didn't medal.

At the second Olympic qualifier he lost his semi to Cassius Chiyanika but beat Michael Anu for the third qualifying spot.

In Beijing he lost to Anvar Yunusov of Tajikistan, 1:9.

Professional boxing record

External links
 Bio
 World 2007

1985 births
Living people
Flyweight boxers
Boxers at the 2006 Commonwealth Games
Commonwealth Games silver medallists for South Africa
Boxers at the 2008 Summer Olympics
Olympic boxers of South Africa
South African people of Danish descent
South African male boxers
Commonwealth Games medallists in boxing
African Games silver medalists for South Africa
African Games medalists in boxing
Competitors at the 2007 All-Africa Games
Medallists at the 2006 Commonwealth Games